Imperial College Press (ICP) was formed in 1995 as a partnership between Imperial College of Science, Technology and Medicine in London and World Scientific publishing.

This publishing house was awarded the rights, by The Nobel Foundation, Sweden, to publish The Nobel Prize: The First 100 years, edited by Agneta Wallin Levinovitz and Nils Ringertz.

They publish areas of teaching and research at Imperial College: Chemistry, Computer Science, Economics, Finance & Management, Engineering, Environmental Science, Life Sciences, Mathematics, Medicine & Healthcare, and Physics.

As of August 2016, ICP has been fully incorporated into World Scientific under the new imprint, World Scientific Europe.

Selected journals 

 Journal of Bioinformatics and Computational Biology
 Journal of Integrative Neuroscience
 International Journal of Innovation Management
 Journal of Environmental Assessment Policy and Management

References

Book publishing companies of the United Kingdom
University presses of the United Kingdom
History of Imperial College London
Publishing companies established in 1995
Organisations associated with Imperial College London